Aggie may refer to:

People
 J. C. Agajanian (1913–1984), American motor sports personality
 Aggie Beynon, Canadian metalsmith
 Aggie Grey (1897–1988), Samoan hotelier born Agnes Genevieve Swann
 Agnes Aggie Herring (1876–1939), American actress
 Adolph Aggie Kukulowicz (1933–2008), Canadian ice hockey player
 Agnes Aggie MacKenzie (born 1955), Scottish presenter of How Clean is Your House?, a British television show
 Forest Sale (1911–1985), American college basketball player and politician
 Agness Underwood (1902–1984), American journalist and newspaper editor
 Agnes Weston (1840–1918), English philanthropist
 Mary Aggie, an early 18th century slave in colonial Virginia whose trial resulted in a change to the law

Arts and entertainment

Fictional characters
 Agatha "Aggie" Prenderghast, from ParaNorman, a 2012 American animated comedy horror film
Aggie, from Nanny McPhee, a 2005 British children's film
 Aggie, from Summer of '42, a 1971 American movie that was adapted into a book and a Broadway musical
 Aggie, from Itty Bitty Titty Committee, a 2007 comedy drama directed by Jamie Babbit
 Aunt Aggie, from Angela's Ashes, a 1996 Irish-American book and 1999 film
 Aasgard Agnette "Aggie" Anderson, the title character of the British television programme The Adventures of Aggie (1956-1957)
 Splendora Agatha "Aggie" Cromwell, from the Halloweentown series of Disney television movies
 Sister Agnes, or "Aggie", one of the two main characters in the 1978 American television series In the Beginning
 Big Aggie, a Nac Mac Feegle from the Discworld fantasy book series
 Aggie James, from the novel Nocturnal by Scott Sigler
 Aggie Jones, on the American soap opera The Bold and the Beautiful
 Aggie McDonald, from Johnny Belinda, a 1940 American play that was adapted into a 1948 film and a 1967 film
 the title character of Aggie Mack, a comic strip created in 1946 by Hal Rasmusson
 Aggie Wilcox, from the Ministry is Murder novel series by American author Emilie Richards
 the title character of the 1950s British television sitcom The Adventures of Aggie

Other uses
 Aggie (film), a 2020 documentary film
 Aggie (marble), a type of marble
 Aggie, US name of the 1950s British television sitcom The Adventures of Aggie
 "Aggie", an episode of the US television series Baretta
 Aggie, later title of the comic strip Aggie Mack
 Aggie Awards, the awards presented each year by Adventure Gamers to the most relevant titles in the adventure genre

Places
 Aggie, Alberta, a locality in Canada
 Aggie Creek, Fairbanks, Alaska
 Aggie Creek, Utah County, Utah
 Aggie Mount, in Bimberi Nature Reserve, Australian Capital Territory, Australia

School nicknames, sports teams or mascots

United States
 University of California, Davis – see UC Davis Aggies
 University of Connecticut, until 1933
 Colorado State University, Fort Collins, Colorado
 Louisiana State University, Baton Rouge, Louisiana
 Mississippi State University, until 1932
 Michigan State University, until 1924
 University of Massachusetts Amherst, until 1931
 New Mexico State University – see New Mexico State Aggies
 North Carolina Agricultural and Technical State University – see North Carolina A&T Aggies
 Aggie (mascot), official mascot of North Carolina Agricultural and Technical State University
 Cameron University, Oklahoma
 Oklahoma Panhandle State University – see Oklahoma Panhandle State Aggies
 Delaware Valley University, Pennsylvania
 Texas A&M University, College Station, Texas – see Texas A&M Aggies
 Utah State University, Logan, Utah – see Utah State Aggies
 Albertville High School, Albertville, Alabama
 Sylacauga High School, Sylacauga, Alabama
 Hamilton High School (Hamilton, Alabama)
 Essex Agricultural and Technical High School, Massachusetts
 Forrest County Agricultural High School, Mississippi
 Norfolk County Agricultural High School, Walpole, Massachusetts

Elsewhere
 University of Manitoba, Canada
 Ontario Agricultural College, University of Guelph, Ontario, Canada
 College of Agriculture, Xavier University – Ateneo de Cagayan, Philippines

Sports facilities
 Aggie Field, a soccer stadium on the campus of the University of California, Davis
 Aggie Stadium (disambiguation)

Other uses
 Cyclone Aggie, an Australian cyclone

See also
 
 
 Agaie, a historical state in present-day Nigeria
 Agey, a commune in Côte-d'Or, Bourgogne, France
 AGG (disambiguation)
 Agge (disambiguation)
 Saint Aggei, Wycliffe's spelling of Mar Aggai, the second Bishop of Edessa, Mesopotamia
 Aggey (disambiguation)
 Aggi (disambiguation)
 Aggy (disambiguation)
 Aghi, a frazione of Foligno, Italy
 Agi (disambiguation)
 Agii (disambiguation)
 Agy, a commune in the Basse-Normandie région of France